Armanda Berta dos Santos (born 11 October 1974) is an East Timorese politician, and the leader of the Kmanek Haburas Unidade Nasional Timor Oan (KHUNTO) political party.

Santos is the more senior of East Timor's two incumbent Deputy Prime Ministers, serving since May 2020 in the VIII Constitutional Government of East Timor led by Prime Minister Taur Matan Ruak.

She is also the incumbent Minister of Social Solidarity and Inclusion, serving in that position since the government was formed in June 2018.

Early life and education
Santos was born into an impoverished rural family in Maloa, Ainaro Municipality, Portuguese Timor (now East Timor). She has a Master's degree in Governance Management.

Political career
Santos has been KHUNTO's leader since its foundation in 2011. In the 2012 East Timorese parliamentary election, KHUNTO won 2.97% of the popular vote, and therefore failed by only 150 votes to overcome the 3% electoral threshold and have two members elected to the National Parliament.

In the 2017 parliamentary election, Santos was elected to the National Parliament as the party's list leader. She also became vice-chairman of the Committee for Infrastructure, Transport and Communications (Committee-E) and a member of the Committee for Economic Affairs and Development (Committee-D).

In the early election in 2018, Santos was ranked #3 in the Alliance for Change and Progress (AMP), of which KHUNTO was a part, and was again elected to the National Parliament. On 22 June 2018, she was sworn in as Minister of Social Solidarity and Inclusion in the new VIII Constitutional Government, and therefore automatically had to give up her parliamentary seat.

Following the breakdown of the AMP coalition in the first few months of 2020, the CNRT, which had been the lead party in that coalition, decided on 30 April 2020 that its members serving in the VIII Constitutional Government would resign their positions. The CNRT informed the Prime Minister of its decision on 8 May 2020, but KHUNTO continued to support the government.

On 12 May 2020, the government approved the creation of two new positions of Deputy Prime Minister, and on 29 May 2020, Santos was sworn in as holder of one of those new positions, while retaining her role as Minister for Social Solidarity and Inclusion.

While serving as Deputy Prime Minister, Santos was KHUNTO's candidate in the 2022 East Timorese presidential election. In an election analysis published by the University of Melbourne, Australia, she was described as:

During the presidential election campaign, Santos was "mocked and denigrated on social media" after she objected to demands that the national presidential debate be conducted in Portuguese. As she pointed out, neither she nor the majority of East Timor's population would even be able to participate in, or even understand, any such debate.

In the ensuing first round of the election process, she finished third out of the 16 candidates, with 56,690 votes (8.7% of the total); that result was described by another commentator as part of a "... power transition from the old to younger generations, and from men to women ..."

Personal life
Naimori is also the founder of KHUNTO, but chose to assume only the position of adviser to the party, with Santos taking on the leadership.

References

External links 

Deputy Prime Ministers of East Timor
Government ministers of East Timor
Kmanek Haburas Unidade Nasional Timor Oan politicians
Social solidarity and inclusion ministers of East Timor
Living people
Members of the National Parliament (East Timor)
Women government ministers of East Timor
21st-century East Timorese politicians
21st-century women politicians
1974 births